Bhookh is a 1978 Bollywood action film directed by H. Dinesh and Ramesh Puri.

Cast
Shatrughan Sinha as Dr. Ajay
Reena Roy as Beena
Asha Sachdev as Asha
Ranjeet as Chhote Thakur Ranjeet Singh
Amjad Khan as Thakur Harnam Singh
Om Shivpuri as Colonel
Krishan Dhawan as Beena's Father
Nazir Hussain as Maulvi
Paintal as Bhikhari
Dina Pathak as Mausi
Indrani Mukherjee as Thakurain
Ratnamala as Tulsi
Aruna Irani as Courtesan

External links
 

1978 films
1970s Hindi-language films
1978 action films
Indian action films
Hindi-language action films